Jones Variety Hits was a 24-hour music format produced by Jones Radio Networks.  Its playlist was composed of adult hits from the 1970s to right now from adult contemporary/adult alternative artists of those eras such as Fleetwood Mac, John Mayer, Pat Benatar, Pearl Jam, etc.; Variety Hits centers most of its music from 1975 to 1985.  This was much similar to its network competitor Jack FM. However, unlike competing networks similar offerings affiliates can brand their station however they like at the local level. Plus this imaging driven format was unlike others that rely strictly on sarcasm.

Overview 
"Variety Hits" was conceived by Jones Radio Networks Senior Director of Programming Jon Holiday. Comparisons were often made between "Variety Hits" the two Bonneville International Adult Hits stations KPKX in Phoenix, WARH St. Louis and Emmis owned BOB-FM KBPA Austin, Texas. The PD of Variety Hits was Dusty Scott.

Jones Variety Hits was merged into S.A.M.: Simply About Music with the acquisition of Jones by Triton Media Group's Dial Global division effective September 30, 2008.

Radio formats
Defunct radio stations in the United States
Defunct radio networks in the United States
Radio stations established in 2008
Radio stations disestablished in 2008